HD 49933 (HR 2530) is a binary star system in the equatorial constellation of Monoceros, the unicorn. The HD designation indicates the identifier of the star found in the Henry Draper catalogue. At an apparent magnitude of 5.8, this star can just be seen with the naked eye under suitably dark conditions.

HD 49933A
Its primary HD 49993A is a Sun-like star. This is an F-type main sequence star with a stellar classification of F2 V, where the luminosity class V indicates that it is generating energy through the nuclear fusion of hydrogen at its core. It is slightly larger than the Sun, with 108% of the Sun's mass and 139% of the Sun's radius. HD 49933 emits 3.47 times as much energy as the Sun from its outer atmosphere at a higher effective temperature of about 6,598 K, giving it the yellow-white hue of an F-type star. It is estimated to be 2.4 billion years old.

The surface magnetic activity on this star is similar to what is observed on the Sun. Magnetic features on the surface have been detected using asteroseismology that appear to be starspots (the stellar equivalent to sunspots on the Sun).

HD 49933B
In 2008 it was discovered the primary star has an 11.3 magnitude common proper motion companion at an angular separation of 5.9 arcseconds, which may make this a binary star system if the pair are gravitationally bound. In 2016, it was confirmed that HD 49933 is orbited by a red dwarf star of spectral class M0.

References

Monoceros (constellation)
049933
F-type main-sequence stars
M-type main-sequence stars
Binary stars
2530
Monocerotis, 82
032851
Durchmusterung objects